Sıçan Island is an islet in the Gulf of Antalya. In the history the islet had a number of names. According to Prof. Mustafa Adak, the oldest name of the islet was  Lyrnateia. During the Roman Empire era it was called Attelebussa (grasshopper) . Italian seamen of the Medieval Ages used the name Renathia. Evliya Çelebi the famous Ottoman Empire traveler of the 17th century called the island Güvercin (dove) and Kuş (bird).  In the 19th century its name was Rasat (observation) 

Its surface area is about .There is a ramp from west to east of the islet and the east side is a high cliff. The uninhabited islet is attractive for the divers. There is also an underwater cave in the east.

References

Islands of Turkey
Islands of Antalya Province
Mediterranean islands